The  is a video game controller produced by Nintendo for the Wii U video game console. It is available in Black and White. It is the successor to the Wii Classic Controller and has the same buttons but with the added features of a power button, and pressable analog sticks. In 2013, a year since the Wii U's release, a hacking website Hackaday found a way to use a Wii U Pro Controller and Wii U Gamepad on PC.

History
Nintendo unveiled the Wii U Pro Controller at E3 2012. Many video game journalists have noted the similarity between the controller and Microsoft's Xbox 360 Controller. In 2016, a 3rd party controller was released by Hori as a "Pokken Tournament Gamepad" However, it is only available in Japan.

In 2017, The Wii U and the Wii U Pro Controller was discontinued, however, some 3rd party outlets still sold them until 2019.

Features
The controller functions as a secondary controller released for the console, available separately. The Wii U system can be connected to up to four Wii U Pro Controllers at one time, however Super Smash Bros. for Wii U allows the usage of more than 4. Like more traditional controllers, it features standard analog sticks (that can now be pressed in) and face buttons. Like the Wii U GamePad and Classic Controller Pro and unlike other eighth generation controllers (i.e., the DualShock 4 and the Xbox One Controller), the triggers are digital (i.e., not analog).

The Wii U Pro Controller uses the same 1300 mAh CTR-003 battery found in the Nintendo 3DS and 2DS, which can last up to 80 hours before needing to be recharged. The charging cable can plug into any USB port.

Nintendo states that the design of the Pro Controller is an "enhanced version" of the Wii's Classic Controller and "offers a richer experience". Certain games with flexible control schemes, such as Call of Duty: Black Ops II and Trine 2: Director's Cut, are also compatible with the Classic Controller. The Wii U Pro Controller is not compatible with previous-generation Wii games.

References

Nintendo controllers
Wii U